The 2014 BBC Sports Personality of the Year Award, took place on 14 December at The SSE Hydro in Glasgow. It was the 61st presentation of the BBC Sports Personality of the Year Award. Awarded annually by the British Broadcasting Corporation (BBC), the main award honours an individual's British sporting achievement over the past year, with the winner selected by public vote from a ten-person shortlist. Lewis Hamilton won the main award.	
	
The event was presented by Gary Lineker, Clare Balding and Gabby Logan.

Basis of nominations
For 2014, the BBC introduced an expert panel who were asked to devise a shortlist that reflected UK sporting achievements on the national and/or international stage, represented the breadth and depth of UK sports and took into account "impact" within and beyond the sport or sporting achievement in question. The 2014 panel was announced on 22 October 2014. The panel members were:
 
Rebecca Adlington: Olympic gold medal-winning swimmer
Denise Lewis: Olympic gold medal-winning athlete
Jason Roberts: former professional footballer
Dame Tanni Grey-Thompson: Paralympic gold medal-winning athlete
 Mike Dunn: sports editor of The Independent and Evening Standard newspapers
 Howard Wheatcroft: Express Newspapers head of sport
 Alex Butler: sports editor of the Sunday Times newspaper
Alison Mitchell: freelance sports broadcaster and journalist
 Louise Martin: chair of SportScotland
Barbara Slater: Director of BBC Sport
 Philip Bernie: head of BBC TV sport 
 Carl Doran; executive editor, BBC Sports Personality of the Year

Nominees
The shortlist of ten contenders was announced during BBC One's The One Show on 24 November and on the BBC website. Early favourites for the award included Rory McIlroy and Lewis Hamilton.

Other awards
In addition to the main award as "Sports Personality of the Year", several other awards were also announced:

Overseas Personality: Cristiano Ronaldo
Team of the Year: England women's national rugby union team
Lifetime Achievement: Sir Chris Hoy
Coach of the Year: Paul McGinley
Helen Rollason Award: Invictus Games Competitors
Young Personality: Claudia Fragapane
Unsung Hero Award: Jill Stidever

In Memoriam

David Coleman
Toby Balding
Jack Brabham
Arthur Montford
Luis Aragones Tito Vilanova
Dorothy Tyler
Michael Scudamore Dessie Hughes
Mickey Duff
Josie Cichockyj Kevan McNicholas
Graham Miles
Norman Mair Stuart Gallacher
Tom Finney
Julian Wilson
Terry Biddlecombe
Ron Noades Malcolm Glazer
Bob Torrance
Bert Williams Dylan Tombides
Eusebio
James Alexander Gordon
Lord Richard Attenborough
Mary Glen Haig Elenor Gordon
Phillip Hughes
Hugh McLeod Jack Kyle
Keri Holdsworth
Bobby Collins Sandy Jardine
Senzo Meyiwa
Christopher Chataway
Alfredo Di Stefano
Elena Baltacha

References

External links
Official website

BBC Sports Personality of the Year awards
2014 in British television
2014 in British sport
Bbc
Bbc
BBC Sports Personality of the Year